Petra Dettenhöfer  (born 4 July 1957 in Schlammersdorf) is a German politician, representative of the Christian Social Union of Bavaria. Since 2008 she has been a member of the Landtag of Bavaria (Bayerischer Landtag)

See also
List of Bavarian Christian Social Union politicians

References

Christian Social Union in Bavaria politicians
People from Neustadt an der Waldnaab (district)
1957 births
Living people